Material handling equipment (MHE) is mechanical equipment used for the movement, storage, control, and protection of materials, goods and products throughout the process of manufacturing, distribution, consumption, and disposal. The different types of equipment can be classified into four major categories: transport equipment, positioning equipment, unit load formation equipment, and storage equipment.

Transport equipment 
Transport equipment is used to move material from one location to another (e.g., between workplaces, between a loading dock and a storage area, etc.), while positioning equipment is used to manipulate material at a single location. The major subcategories of transport equipment are conveyors, cranes, and industrial trucks. Material can also be transported manually using no equipment.

Conveyors 
Conveyors are used when material is to be moved frequently between specific points over a fixed path and when there is a sufficient flow volume to justify the fixed conveyor investment. Different types of conveyors can be characterized by the type of product being handled: unit load or bulk load; the conveyor's location: in-floor, on-floor, or overhead, and whether or not loads can accumulate on the conveyor. Accumulation allows intermittent movement of each unit of material transported along the conveyor, while all units move simultaneously on conveyors without accumulation capability. For example, while both the roller and flat-belt are unit-load on-floor conveyors, the roller provides accumulation capability while the flat-belt does not; similarly, both the power-and-free and trolley are unit-load overhead conveyors, with the power-and-free designed to include an extra track in order to provide the accumulation capability lacking in the trolley conveyor. Examples of bulk-handling conveyors include the magnetic-belt, troughed-belt, bucket, and screw conveyors. A sortation conveyor system is used for merging, identifying, inducting, and separating products to be conveyed to specific destinations, and typically consists of flat-belt, roller, and chute conveyor segments together with various moveable arms and/or pop-up wheels and chains that deflect, push, or pull products to different destinations.

Cranes 

Cranes are used to transport loads over variable (horizontal and vertical) paths within a restricted area and when there is insufficient (or intermittent) flow volume such that the use of a conveyor cannot be justified. Cranes provide more flexibility in movement than conveyors because the loads handled can be more varied with respect to their shape and weight. Cranes provide less flexibility in movement than industrial trucks because they only can operate within a restricted area, though some can operate on a portable base. Most cranes utilize trolley-and-tracks for horizontal movement and hoists for vertical movement, although manipulators can be used if precise positioning of the load is required. The most common cranes include the jib, bridge, gantry, and stacker cranes.

Industrial trucks 

Industrial trucks are trucks that are not licensed to travel on public roads (commercial trucks are licensed to travel on public roads). Industrial trucks are used to move materials over variable paths and when there is insufficient (or intermittent) flow volume such that the use of a conveyor cannot be justified. They provide more flexibility in movement than conveyors and cranes because there are no restrictions on the area covered, and they provide vertical movement if the truck has lifting capabilities. Different types of industrial trucks can be characterized by whether or not they have forks for handling pallets, provide powered or require manual lifting and travel capabilities, allow the operator to ride on the truck or require that the operator walk with the truck during travel, provide load stacking capability, and whether or not they can operate in narrow aisles.

Hand trucks (including carts and dollies), the simplest type of industrial truck, cannot transport or stack pallets, is non-powered, and requires the operator to walk. A pallet jack, which cannot stack a pallet, uses front wheels mounted inside the end of forks that extend to the floor as the pallet is only lifted enough to clear the floor for subsequent travel. A counterbalanced lift truck (sometimes referred to as a forklift truck, but other attachments besides forks can be used) can transport and stack pallets and allows the operator to ride on the truck. The weight of the vehicle (and operator) behind the front wheels of truck counterbalances weight of the load (and weight of vehicle beyond front wheels); the front wheels act as a fulcrum or pivot point. Narrow-aisle trucks usually require that the operator stand-up while riding in order to reduce the truck's turning radius. Reach mechanisms and outrigger arms that straddle and support a load can be used in addition to the just the counterbalance of the truck. On a turret truck, the forks rotate during stacking, eliminating the need for the truck itself to turn in narrow aisles. An order picker allows the operator to be lifted with the load to allow for less-than-pallet-load picking. Automated guided vehicles (AGVs) are industrial trucks that can transport loads without requiring a human operator.

An electric tug is a small battery powered and pedestrian operated machine capable of either pushing or pulling a significantly heavier load than itself.

Manual Handling Equipment 
Commonly used to assist in moving smaller loads where larger equipment would struggle, manual handling equipment such as pallet trucks, trolleys, and sack trucks can be an essential part of any material handling.

Yard ramp 
A yard ramp, sometimes called a mobile yard ramp, is a movable metal ramp for loading and unloading of vehicles. A yard ramp is placed at the back of a vehicle to provide access for forklifts to ascend the ramp. Using a yard ramp for vehicle loading or unloading allows the work to be carried out by a forklift.

Positioning equipment 
Positioning equipment is used to handle material at a single location. It can be used at a workplace to feed, orient, load/unload, or otherwise manipulate materials so that are in the correct position for subsequent handling, machining, transport, or storage. As compared to manual handling, the use of positioning equipment can raise the productivity of each worker when the frequency of handling is high, improve product quality and limit damage to materials and equipment when the item handled is heavy or awkward to hold and damage is likely through human error or inattention, and can reduce fatigue and injuries when the environment is hazardous or inaccessible. In many cases, positioning equipment is required for and can be justified by the ergonomic requirements of a task. Examples of positioning equipment include lift/tilt/turn tables, hoists, balancers, manipulators, and industrial robots. Manipulators act as “muscle multipliers” by counterbalancing the weight of a load so that an operator lifts only a small portion (1%) of the load's weight, and they fill the gap between hoists and industrial robots: they can be used for a wider range of positioning tasks than hoists and are more flexible than industrial robots due to their use of manual control. They can be powered manually, electrically, or pneumatically, and a manipulator's end-effector can be equipped with mechanical grippers, vacuum grippers, electromechanical grippers, or other tooling.

Unit load formation equipment 

Unit load formation equipment is used to restrict materials so that they maintain their integrity when handled a single load during transport and for storage. If materials are self-restraining (e.g., a single part or interlocking parts), then they can be formed into a unit load with no equipment. Examples of unit load formation equipment include pallets, skids, slipsheets, tote pans, bins/baskets, cartons, bags, and crates. A pallet is a platform made of wood (the most common), paper, plastic, rubber, or metal with enough clearance beneath its top surface (or face) to enable the insertion of forks for subsequent lifting purposes. A slipsheet is a thick piece of paper, corrugated fiber, or plastic upon which a load is placed and has tabs that can be grabbed by special push/pull lift truck attachments. They are used in place of a pallet to reduce weight and volume, but loading/unloading is slower.

Storage equipment 

Storage equipment is used for holding or buffering materials over a period of time. The design of each type of storage equipment, along with its use in warehouse design, represents a trade-off between minimizing handling costs, by making material easily accessible, and maximizing the utilization of space (or cube). If materials are stacked directly on the floor, then no storage equipment is required, but, on average, each different item in storage will have a stack only half full; to increase cube utilization, storage racks can be used to allow multiple stacks of different items to occupy the same floor space at different levels. The use of racks becomes preferable to floor storage as the number of units per item requiring storage decreases. Similarly, the depth at which units of an item are stored affects cube utilization in proportion to the number of units per item requiring storage.

Pallets can be stored using single- and double-deep racks when the number of units per item is small, while pallet-flow and push-back racks are used when the units per item are mid-range, and floor-storage or drive-in racks are used when the number of units per item is large, with drive-in providing support for pallet loads that cannot be stacked on top of each other. Individual cartons can either be picked from pallet loads or can be stored in carton-flow racks, which are designed to allow first-in, first-out (FIFO) carton access. For individual piece storage, bin shelving, storage drawers, carousels, and A-frames can be used. An automatic storage/retrieval system (AS/RS) is an integrated computer-controlled storage system that combines storage medium, transport mechanism, and controls with various levels of automation for fast and accurate random storage of products and materials.

Identification and Control Equipment 
Equipment used to collect and communicate the information that is used to coordinate the flow of materials within a facility and between a facility and its suppliers and customers. The identification of materials and associated control can be performed manually with no specialized equipment.

See also 
Material handling
Caster
 Drum handler
Electric tug
Forklift truck
Automated guided vehicle
Pallet
Slip sheet
Industrial robot
Electric track vehicle system
 Packaging machinery
Pallet racking
 Pallet inverter
Automated storage and retrieval system
Bulk material handling
Warehouse
Telescopic handler

Notes

References 
 Chu, H.K., Egbelu, P.J., and Wu, C.T., 1995, "ADVISOR: A computer-aided material handling equipment selection system", Int. J. Prod. Res., 33(12):3311−3329.
 Kay, M.G., 2012, Material Handling Equipment, Retrieved 2014-10-02.
 Kulwiec, R.A., Ed., 1985, Materials Handling Handbook, 2nd Ed., New York: Wiley.
 Mulcahy, D.E., 1999, Materials Handling Handbook, New York: McGraw-Hill.
 Tompkins, J.A., White, J.A., Bozer, Y.A., and Tanchoco, J.M.A., 2003, Facilities Planning, 3rd Ed., Wiley, Appendix 5.B.

External links

College Industry Council on Material Handling Education (CICMHE)
European Federation of Materials Handling
Industrial Truck Association
Material Handling Equipment Distributors Association
Material Handling Equipment Taxonomy
Material Handling Industry

 
Equipment
Industrial equipment